Elisa Rigaudo (born 17 June 1980) is an Italian race walker from Cuneo.

She won eight medals, seven of these at senior level, at the International athletics competitions.

Biography
She is affiliated with the Fiamme Gialle Castelporziano sports club. Rigaudo represented her country at the Summer Olympics in 2004 and 2008. She was the bronze medallist over 20 km at the 2011 European Race Walking Cup and went on to place fourth at the 2011 World Championships in Athletics, which was later upgraded to silver medal after disqualifications.
In 2002, she received a public warning for high levels of caffeine in her doping sample. She came third at the 2012 Memorial Mario Albisetti, finishing behind Russia's Tatyana Sibileva.

Progression
20 km walk

Achievements

National titles
Elisa Rigaudo has won 13 times the individual national championship.
2 wins in the 5000 m walk track (2004, 2007)
1 win in the 10 km walk (2013)
4 wins in the 20 km walk (2003, 2004, 2005, 2008)
6 wins in the 3000 metres walk indoor (2004, 2005, 2006, 2007, 2008, 2009)

See also
 Italy at the European Race Walking Cup - Multiple medalists
 Italian all-time lists - 20 km walk

References

External links
 
 
 Elisa Rigaudo at La marcia nel mondo 

1980 births
Living people
People from Cuneo
Italian female racewalkers
Athletes (track and field) at the 2004 Summer Olympics
Athletes (track and field) at the 2008 Summer Olympics
Athletes (track and field) at the 2012 Summer Olympics
Athletes (track and field) at the 2016 Summer Olympics
Olympic athletes of Italy
Olympic bronze medalists for Italy
Athletics competitors of Fiamme Gialle
European Athletics Championships medalists
Medalists at the 2008 Summer Olympics
World Athletics Championships athletes for Italy
Olympic bronze medalists in athletics (track and field)
Athletes (track and field) at the 2005 Mediterranean Games
Mediterranean Games gold medalists for Italy
Mediterranean Games medalists in athletics
Sportspeople from the Province of Cuneo